Tall Oaks, also known as the S. McLendon House, is a historic home located at Bishopville, Lee County, South Carolina.  It was built about 1847, and is a two-story, vernacular Greek Revival style house. It has a hipped roof and rests on a brick foundation. On the front façade is a two-story, gable-roofed pedimented portico with four large stuccoed brick columns and Doric order capitals. An original brick kitchen still stands behind the main house.

It was added to the National Register of Historic Places in 1986.

References 

Houses on the National Register of Historic Places in South Carolina
Greek Revival houses in South Carolina
Houses completed in 1847
Houses in Lee County, South Carolina
National Register of Historic Places in Lee County, South Carolina
1847 establishments in South Carolina